The following Union Army and Confederate Army units and commanders fought in the Battle of Carnifex Ferry of the American Civil War on September 10, 1861, in Nicholas County, Virginia (now West Virginia).

Abbreviations used

Military rank
 BG = Brigadier General
 Col = Colonel
 Ltc = Lieutenant Colonel
 Cpt = Captain

Other
 w = wounded
 k = killed

Union Forces

Army of Occupation

BG William S. Rosecrans

Confederate Forces

Army of the Kanawha

BG John Buchanan Floyd

22nd Virginia Infantry Regiment "1st Kanawha Infantry": Col Christopher Q. Tompkins
36th Virginia Infantry Regiment "2nd Kanawha Infantry": Col John McCausland
45th Virginia Infantry Regiment: Col Henry Heth
50th Virginia Infantry Regiment: Col Alexander W. Reynolds
51st Virginia Infantry Regiment: Col Gabriel C. Wharton
 51st Virginia Militia Regiment: Ltc William W. Glass
 Beckett's Cavalry Company: Cpt. Albert J. Beckett
 Corn's Cavalry Company: Cpt. James M. Corn
 Virginia Light Artillery "Gauley Artillery": Cpt. Stephen Adams
 State Volunteer Artillery: Cpt. John H. Guy

See also

 West Virginia in the American Civil War

Notes

References
 The Official Records of the War of the Rebellion, Ser. 1, Vol. 5, p. 128.
 Ohio Roster Commission. Official Roster of the Soldiers of the State of Ohio in the War on the Rebellion, 1861–1865, Compiled Under the Direction of the Roster Commission 12 vol. (Akron, OH: Werner Co.), 1886–1895.
 Reid, Whitelaw. Ohio in the War: Her Statesmen, Her Generals, and Soldiers (Cincinnati, OH: Moore, Wilstach, & Baldwin), 1868.

External links
 Carnifex Ferry Battlefield State Park

American Civil War orders of battle